Stephanie Simmons is a Canadian Research Chair in Quantum Computing at Simon Fraser University. She was named by Caldwell Partners as one of Canada's Top 40 Under 40 in 2020. Her research considers the development of silicon-based systems for quantum computing. She is the founder and Chief Quantum Officer at Photonic Inc., a spin out company which focusses on the commercial development of silicon photonics spin qubits.

Early life and education 
Simmons started her scientific career at the University of Waterloo as an undergraduate student in mathematics and mathematical physics. She moved to the United Kingdom for her graduate research, where she worked toward her doctorate in materials science at the University of Oxford. She was a Clarendon Scholar at Magdalen College, Oxford. Her doctoral research looked at the creation of entanglement in condensed matter spin systems.

Research and career 
Simmons was a research fellow in electrical engineering at the University of New South Wales. In Australia she worked with Andrea Morello on silicon-based quantum computing. She was part of the UNSW team who first demonstrated quantum logic between two electrons in a silicon chip. Using a conventional semiconductor manufacturing process, Simmons worked on a controlled-not gate (CNOT) that makes use of electron spin to store quantum information.

Simmons joined the faculty at Simon Fraser University in 2015, where she leads the Silicon Quantum Technology laboratory. Her research focuses on the qubits associated with luminescent defects in silicon. She was named a Canada Research Chair in 2017, and concentrated her efforts on the development of the world's first quantum computer. She has advised the Canadian government on quantum technology.

Awards and honours 

 2013 Physics World Top Ten Breakthrough of the Year
 2015 Physics World Top Ten Breakthrough of the Year
 2020 Canada's Top 40 Under 40
 2021 YWCA Women of Distinction Award
 2022 Arthur B. McDonald Fellowship

Select publications

Personal life 
Simmons has two children.

References 

Canadian women computer scientists
Canadian computer scientists
Academic staff of Simon Fraser University
Living people
Year of birth missing (living people)
University of Waterloo alumni
Alumni of the University of Oxford
Academic staff of the University of New South Wales